Namibian passports are issued to citizens of Namibia to travel internationally.

Namibian passports are green, with the national coat of arms emblazoned on the front cover. "REPUBLIC OF NAMIBIA" is inscribed above the coat of arms and "PASSPORT" is inscribed below. The "Biometric" logo also appears above "PASSPORT". All information in the passport is printed in English with the photo page also translated into French.

History
The first Namibian passports were introduced in 1990, shortly after the country gained its independence from South Africa. In January 2018, a new biometric passport type was introduced; existing non-biometric passports issued until said date continue to be valid until expired.

Namibian Passport Power
As of the 2022 passport index, the Namibian passport is 62nd in global power rank, sharing this place with Azerbaijan and having left behind the passport of the Philippines. In 2022 the mobility score of Namibian citizens has reached its highest - 80. Holders of Namibian passports can visit 40 countries without a visa and 37 countries with a visa on arrival.

Identification page
 Passport holder photo (Width: 37mm, Height: 52mm, Head height (up to the top of the hair): 70%; Distance from top the of the photo to the top of the hair: 8%)
 Type ("P" for passport)
 Code of the country
 Serial number of the passport
 Surname and first name of the passport holder
 Citizenship
 Date of birth
 Gender (M for men or F for women)
 Place of Birth
 Date of issuance
 Expiry date
 Issuing authority
 Passport holder's signature
 Machine-readable code

Renewal Abroad
Namibian passports can be renewed abroad. Renewal is available only if the current passport has less than 1 year validity left. Full list of documents and fees depends on each local embassy or consulate. The processing time of renewal a Namibian passport abroad is usually 1-3 months.

Gallery of historic images

See also
 List of passports
 Visa requirements for Namibian citizens

References

Namibia
Foreign relations of Namibia